Allen Chapel is a farming community in Houston County, Texas on Texas State Highway 7, 1 mile from Ratcliff.  It was settled by recently freed slaves in the 1870s.  A Methodist church was established there around 1900, and a school in 1910.

References

Unincorporated communities in Houston County, Texas
Unincorporated communities in Texas